Here Come the Lords is the debut studio album by American hip hop group Lords of the Underground. It was released in 1993 by Pendulum and Elektra Records. It was produced by Marley Marl and K-Def.

The album was a success for the group, making it to #66 on the Billboard 200 and #13 on the Top R&B/Hip-Hop Albums chart. Five singles from the album managed to make it to the Billboard charts, "Chief Rocka," "Here Come the Lords," "Funky Child," "Flow On," and "Psycho."

Critical reception

Spin called the album "one of the most consistent East Coast rap records from a year of boom-bap abundance." Trouser Press wrote: "Smoothly entertaining, loaded with diverting references, nearly wholesome and just loopy enough to make a lasting impression, Here Come the Lords walks a cagey line between straight-up hardcore and a slightly removed pop version of it."

Track listing
All tracks written by Al'Terik Wardrick, Dupré Kelly, and Marlon Williams. Tracks #1, #2, #3, #9, #11, #13, and #14 are also written by K-Def. All tracks produced by Marley Marl and co-produced by K-Def.

Charts

Weekly charts

Year-end charts

References

External links
 

Lords of the Underground albums
1993 debut albums
Elektra Records albums
Pendulum Records albums
Albums produced by K-Def
Albums produced by Marley Marl